A Million Random Digits with 100,000 Normal Deviates is a random number book by the RAND Corporation, originally published in 1955.  The book, consisting primarily of a random number table, was an important 
20th century work in the field of statistics and random numbers.

Production and background
It was produced starting in 1947 by an electronic simulation of a roulette wheel attached to a computer, the results of which were then carefully filtered and tested before being used to generate the table. The RAND table was an important breakthrough in delivering random numbers, because such a large and carefully prepared table had never before been available. In addition to being available in book form, one could also order the digits on a series of punched cards.

The table is formatted as 400 pages, each containing 50 lines of 50 digits.  Columns and lines are grouped in fives, and the lines are numbered 00000 through 19999.  The standard normal deviates are another 200 pages (10 per line, lines 0000 through 9999), with each deviate given to three decimal places. There are 28 additional pages of front matter.

Utility
The main use of the tables was in statistics and the experimental design of scientific experiments, especially those that used the Monte Carlo method; in cryptography, they have also been used as nothing up my sleeve numbers, for example in the design of the Khafre cipher. The book was one of the last of a series of random number tables produced from the mid-1920s to the 1950s, after which the development of high-speed computers allowed faster operation through the generation of pseudorandom numbers rather than reading them from tables.

2001 edition
The book was reissued in 2001 with a new foreword by RAND Executive Vice President Michael D. Rich. It has generated many humorous user reviews on Amazon.com.

Sample
The digits  begin:

References

Additional sources 
 George W. Brown, "History of RAND's random digits—Summary," in A.S. Householder, G.E. Forsythe, and H.H. Germond, eds., Monte Carlo Method, National Bureau of Standards Applied Mathematics Series, 12 (Washington, D.C.: U.S. Government Printing Office, 1951): 31–32. (Available here for download from the RAND Corporation.)

External links 
 Full text downloadable from rand.org
 A Million Random Digits' Was a Number-Cruncher's Bible. Now One Has Exposed Flaws in the Disorder. at wsj.com

1955 non-fiction books
Probability books
RAND Corporation
Mathematical tables
Random number generation